Korina Perkovac (born 7 July 1999) is a Swiss volleyball player. She is a member of the Women's National Team.
She participated at the 2018 Montreux Volley Masters.
She plays for Volley Nachwuchs Luzern. She is the daughter of Goran Perkovac.

References

External links 

 FIVB Profile
 

1999 births
Living people
Swiss women's volleyball players
Swiss people of Croatian descent